The 15th Annual Panasonic Gobel Awards honoring the favorite in Indonesian television programming/production work/individual, was held on March 27, 2012, at the Djakarta Theater XXI in Jalan M.H. Thamrin, Menteng, Central Jakarta. Both of presenter Choky Sitohang and Fenita Arie was hosting for the ceremony awards. The 2012 edition of the Panasonic Gobel Awards was themed for "Yang Muda Yang Menginspirasi" (en: Inspiring Young). 

The awards featured some of Indonesia's best singers such as Ungu, Kotak, Princess, Mulan Jameela and many more. The performers, both singers and nominee readers wore formal clothes designed by Indonesia's best designers and the evening peak of 2012 awards ceremony was broadcast live by TV stations under MNC Group, such as RCTI, MNCTV, and Global TV.

Vote system
The election system starts with the determination of nominations per each category by a team of verification of the Indonesian television beings composed of nine representatives of the television industry, such as broadcasters, production houses, the Indonesian Broadcasting Commission, actress/actor and others. The determination is based on ratings show the highest and determination through a poll via telephone (phone interview).

Panasonic Gobel has opened polls to the public for 30 categories on February 25 until March 24, 2012, which can then be sorted by BDO Tanubrata, to obtain data that is valid poll, is 1 ID for 1 vote. Polls can be done through 4 medium: SMS, online, letters and fliers. This year, first time of this 2012 awards ceremony add a number of premium SMS to 3 numbers, in order to reach the wider society; 6222 for Linktone, 9981 for Vivanews and 7288 for Surya Citra Media.

Winners and nominees 
The nominees were announced on February 24, 2012. The categories added the new category of "Favorite Investigation Program" and category of "Favorite Music/Variety Show Program" was separated into each. Winners are listed first and highlighted on boldface.

Program

Individual

References

External links
 PGA 2012 Official Website

Panasonic Gobel Awards
2012 television awards